Mac Cone (born August 23, 1952, in Memphis, Tennessee, United States) is a Canadian citizen who competes in show jumping.

At the 2008 Summer Olympics in Beijing, Cone won the silver medal as part of the Canadian team in team jumping, together with Jill Henselwood, Eric Lamaze, and Ian Millar.

He rides a 12-year-old Dutch Warmblood gelding named Ole. Mac also rides an 8-year-old Dutch Warmblood named Unanimous.  Unanimous is by Andiamo and is owned by Southern Ways Limited and the Unanimous Group.

Mac Cone is the only rider to have ridden as a member of both the Canadian Equestrian Team and the United States Equestrian Team.  He currently lives in King City, Ontario, Canada where he coaches at the Southern Ways equestrian facility.

References
Profile

1952 births
Living people
Canadian male equestrians
Equestrians at the 1996 Summer Olympics
Equestrians at the 2008 Summer Olympics
Olympic equestrians of Canada
Olympic silver medalists for Canada
Sportspeople from King, Ontario
Sportspeople from Memphis, Tennessee
Olympic medalists in equestrian
Canadian show jumping riders
Medalists at the 2008 Summer Olympics
American emigrants to Canada
Pan American Games medalists in equestrian
Pan American Games silver medalists for Canada
Equestrians at the 2007 Pan American Games
Medalists at the 2007 Pan American Games
21st-century Canadian people
20th-century Canadian people